The Battle of Déols was a battle c. 469 when the Visigoths thwarted an attack by an alliance of Bretons or Britons of the Romano-British Riothamus and the Gauls.

References

5th century in sub-Roman Gaul
469
460s conflicts
460s in the Roman Empire
Deols
History of Indre
Battles involving the Britons
Battles involving the Roman Empire
Battles involving the Visigoths
Roman Gaul